Charles John Ferguson (usually known as C. J. Ferguson) (1840 – 1 December 1904) was an English architect who practised mainly in Carlisle, Cumbria.  He was the younger son of Joseph Ferguson of Carlisle, and was articled to the architect and surveyor John A. Cory.  He spent some years in partnership with Cory, but most of his career was in single-handed practice.  From about 1902 he also had an office in London.

Ferguson's output included new churches, restoration of existing churches, and work on country houses and public buildings.  The architectural styles he used were mainly Gothic and Norman Revival.  Almost all his works are in what is now Cumbria, with a few isolated commissions elsewhere.  The latter were obtained through personal contacts, for example his work for William Armstrong at Bamburgh Castle, Northumberland, and for J. J. Bibby of the Bibby Line in Shropshire.  In the Buildings of England series Ferguson is described as being "a resourceful as well as a sensitive architect".

See also
List of works by C. J. Ferguson

Notes and references
Notes

Citations

Sources

 

 

1840 births
1904 deaths
Architects from Cumbria